The Guilt of Lavinia Morland is a 1920 German silent drama film directed by Joe May and starring Mia May, Albert Steinrück and Alfred Gerasch.

The film's sets were designed by the art director Erich Kettelhut, Paul Leni and Erich Zander.

Cast
 Mia May as Lavinia Morland
 Albert Steinrück as John Morland
 Alfred Gerasch as Vicomte Gaston de Cardillac
 Paul Bildt as Harry Scott
 Loni Nest as Lavinias Kind
 Albert Patry as Dr. Harrison
 Otto Treptow as Diener
 Kitty Aschenbach
 Rosa Valetti

References

Bibliography
 Parish, James Robert. Film Directors Guide: Western Europe. Scarecrow Press, 1976.

External links

1920 films
Films of the Weimar Republic
German silent feature films
Films directed by Joe May
German black-and-white films
1920 drama films
German drama films
UFA GmbH films
Silent drama films
1920s German films
1920s German-language films